Maria Suely Silva Campos  (born March 14, 1953) is a Brazilian businesswoman and politician. She was governor of the State of Roraima between the years 2015 and 2018. She is affiliated with the Progressive Party (Brazil).

She replaced her husband and candidate Neudo Ribeiro Campos in the race for the governorship of the state of Roraima in provincial elections in 2014. She received the first placement in the first round and won the election in the second round against the incumbent governor Chico Rodrigues.

References

Living people
1953 births
Governors of Roraima
Members of the Chamber of Deputies (Brazil) from Roraima
Progressistas politicians
People from Boa Vista, Roraima
Women state governors of Brazil